The Texas Negro League was a Negro baseball league organized in 1924 and lasted until 1949.

Teams
(Teams listed in alphabetical order)

1949Birmingham BluesFt. Worth GiantsHot SpringsNew Orleans CreolesOklahoma City BravesShreveport TigersSan Antonio*The New Orleans Creoles won the championship.

See also
Negro league baseball

References

External links
Center for Negro League Research
Baseball-reference

Negro baseball leagues
Defunct baseball leagues in the United States
Baseball leagues in Alabama
Baseball leagues in Louisiana
Baseball leagues in Oklahoma
Baseball leagues in Texas
Sports leagues established in 1924
Sports leagues disestablished in 1949
1924 establishments in the United States
1949 disestablishments in the United States